Our Lady of Mt. Carmel Church is  catholic parish church in B. Pallipatti village near Bommidi in Dharmapuri district in Tamil Nadu, India. This church is famous for its Jesus life story open theater drama performed every year. Also this is one of the oldest parish in Dharamapuri Diocese.

History

In the records, before 1750 Catholics lived in this village, probably because of missionaries from Mysore.

As  Salem diocese was separated from  Kumbakonam diocese in 1930, Pallipatti became a parish and Fr. Charles Devin became the first parish priest. During his period, around 102 catholic families were lived around this village.

Education
Founded by Fr. Charles Devin in 1932, St. Mary Primary School was converted into a middle school in 1952 and a high school in 1992. Due to insufficient space, a new school was built opposite the church under the name Mount Carmel High School. In 2008, the school became Mount Carmel High Secondary School. In 2003,  SMMI sisters opened an English Medium School in Lourdepuram near B.Pallipatti. In 2005, they built a convent next to the school and started a medical clinic for the villagers.

See also
 B Pallipatti
 St. Francis Xavier Church, Kovilur
 Our Lady of Mount Carmel
 Our Lady of Lourdes

References 

Roman Catholic churches in Tamil Nadu
Churches in Dharmapuri district
Archdiocese of Pondicherry and Cuddalore